The 2021 campionato italiano velocità season is the 20th season. The season started on the 17th April in Mugello and ends on the 10th October in Vallelunga. The season consists of 6 events with 2 races.

Race Calendar
All rounds were held in Italy.

Entry List

All entries use Pirelli tyres.

Results

Championship standings

Notes

References

External links 

2021 in Superbike racing
Motorcycle racing in Italy